Stebin Ben is an Indian playback singer and performer from Bhopal. He has given voice for films, Shimla Mirchi (2020), Hotel Mumbai (2019), TV series, Class of 2017 and Kaisi Yeh Yaariaan. He also sung singles, Rula Ke Gaya Ishq (2019) and Mera Mehboob (2019), released by Zee Music Company and Sony Music India.

Career 
Stebin began his music career by singing covers of songs like Mera Dil Bhi Kitna Pagal Hain (from Venus Music), Bheegi Bheegi Raaton Mein, Yeh Jo Halka Halka Suroor Hai and Chupana Bhi Nahi Aata. He made his debut in playback singing with 2017 Hindi web series, Class of 2017 and lent his voice for Kaisi Yeh Yaariaan. He did a cover of Ye Jo Halka Halka Suroor Hai, featuring Niti Taylor, received over 6 million views on YouTube.

In 2019, he made his film debut in playback singing with the song Humein Bharat Kehte Hain in the film Hotel Mumbai, followed Ishq Di Feeling for 2020 film Shimla Mirchi, composed by Meet Bros.

Discography

Singles and covers

Films

TV/Web series

Awards and recognition 
In September 2018, he was awarded Best Bollywood Artist of the year at India Nightlife Awards 2018. He is the winner of T-Series StageWorks's singing contest The Stage in 2016. In October 2014, Stebin Ben won the Best Performance Award at MTV Asia's Project Aloft Star India (season 1).

See also 

 List of people from Madhya Pradesh

References

External links 
 Stebin Ben on Hungama.com
 Stebin Ben on iTune

Living people
21st-century Indian singers
21st-century Indian male singers
Year of birth missing (living people)